Porches Pottery is a producer of hand-painted pottery in the town of Porches, in the Algarve region of Portugal. The pottery was founded in 1968 by artists Patrick Swift and Lima de Freitas, in order to revive a traditional Algarve pottery industry that was rapidly dying out in favour of more modern techniques. Swift and de Freitas chose Porches for its history as a pottery centre, dating back for many centuries, and for its clay pits.

History
The origins of Porches Pottery date to the early 1960s, when Irish artist Patrick Swift first came to the Algarve and encountered a region with a system of commerce and production based around craft activities that had changed little since the Middle Ages. As plastic and metal wares entered the market, the potters found it increasingly difficult to compete and were reduced to making simple flower pots. In his book, Algarve: a portrait and a guide (1965), Swift had noted this decline, saying of the dishes he would insist on using: "All the basic dishes were of the local Lagoa pottery — easily breakable and poorly glazed. But aesthetically pleasing and so cheap that breakages were no tragedy. Replacements after all helped to encourage an industry threatened with extinction. Even now some of the nicer old kitchen objects can no longer be obtained at the pottery. ‘People don’t buy them anymore,’ say the potters, ‘so we’ve stopped making them.’" 

Saddened by this decline, Swift was determined to revive the craft and realize his idealistic dream; to prove that the traditional craft-based form of socio-economic production, that had existed throughout Europe until the Industrial revolution, could be successful in the modern world. The artist eventually wanted an arts & crafts centre where traditional craftspeople  could ply their trade and sell their goods. He was soon joined by Portuguese artist Lima de Freitas who shared his views and helped him found the pottery. Swift in his book on Lisbon: "My reason for meeting Lima on this occasion was not to talk about art. It was something much stranger stemming from our basically sympathetic view points, we had embarked on a scheme so foolhardy that, looking back on it, I do not know how we had the temerity to start. This was nothing less than to try and resuscitate the local pottery industry in our part of Algarve."

To realize the venture the two artists first approached the potter, Mestre Gregório Rodrigues, who agreed to work with them (his son, Mestre Fernando Rodrigues, worked alongside him at PorchesPottery). Swift purchased common oxides from the local hardware store, constructed a wood-burning kiln and proceeded to decorate Gregório's pots. The initial results were discouraging, but undeterred, they sought professional technical advice from ceramists in Lisbon, acquired an efficient kiln. Their workshop was a small 17th-century farmhouse, today a ceramics workshop called Olaria Pequena. The pottery was soon relocated to a larger building, designed by Swift, a little further down the EN125 on the western outskirts of Porches. They trained local people in the mastered control of the brush, painting freely and directly onto tin glaze in the traditional majolica technique.

Craft - Style - The Pottery
Craft: 
Porches Pottery produces majolica, which i tin-glazed earthenware. The technique is thought to have originated in Persia though was well established in Mesopotamia by the 9th century, where it became an alternative to the much esteemed porcelain that was beginning to appear in China. Introduced into Europe by the Moors, Iberia became famous as a centre of excellence for this type of pottery, which, due to its popular appeal, was soon spread throughout the rest of Europe.
 
Style: 
The two artists researched the designs and motifs of ancient pottery, visiting museums throughout Europe, until finally some basic patterns began to emerge as being typical of the influences imposed by past civilisations that had once dominated the Algarve. These designs include the various animals, flowers and foliage that have become associated with Porches Pottery.

The Pottery: 
Swift designed the building that houses Porches Pottery to resemble a 17th-century farmhouse. (In Porches he also designed the interior of a 17th-century building, which he helped restore, that today is the O Leão de Porches restaurant; the original building and entrance to the International School of the Algarve, which he was instrumental in founding; the stations of the cross at the Igreja Matriz (Porches), where he is buried.) The pottery has an adjoining Café, Bar Bacchus, which is decorated with tiles painted by Swift. There is an outside eating area decorated with tiles designed by Swift's late daughter, Katherine Swift, who managed the pottery following her father's death. Porches Pottery is still run by the Swift family. Porches Pottery's role in the revival of the regional craft has been recognised.

References

Bibliography and external Links
 Porches Pottery website
Olaria Algarve Porches Pottery: The First Fifty Years, Olariamajolica Swift Lda., 2018 by Paul Bond and Brian Fortune
 Patrick Swift: An Irish Painter In Portugal, Gandon Editions, 2001; contributions by Fernando de Azvedo (painter and President of Sociedade de Bellas Artes, Lisbon), Brian Fallon (chief arts critic to The Irish Times for 35 years) and Peter Murray (curator and director of the Crawford Gallery, Cork)
 Patrick Swift 1927–83 Retrospective Catalogue, Irish Museum of Modern Art, 1993; essays on Swift by Anthony Cronin (poet) and Aidan Dunne (art critic).
 Introduction to Swift's Crawford Municipal Art Gallery Exhibition (2001) by Richard Morphet (Keeper Tate Britain 1986–1998) link

Algarve
Ceramics manufacturers of Portugal
Art pottery
Portuguese brands